Hillsdale is a populated place in Garfield County, in the U.S. state of Utah.

History
The first settlement at Hillsdale was made in 1871. A post office called Hillsdale was established in 1872, and remained in operation until 1886.   The community was named for hills near the town site.

References

Ghost towns in Utah